Joe Minter (born March 28, 1943) is an American sculptor based in Birmingham, Alabama. His African Village in America, on the southwest edge of Birmingham, is an ever-evolving art environment populated by sculptures he makes from scrap metal and found materials; its theme is recognition of African American history from the first arrivals of captured Africans to the present. Individual pieces from Minter's thirty-year project have been in major exhibitions in the United States and are in the permanent collections of the National Gallery of Art, the Smithsonian American Art Museum, and the Metropolitan Museum of Art, among others.

Early life
Minter was born in Birmingham, Alabama, the eighth child into a family of ten. His father was a mechanic during World War I, but after the war, was unable to find a job in his field. Minter's father instead worked for thirty years as caretaker of a white cemetery. Joe Minter attended local Birmingham schools, was drafted in 1965 and discharged in 1967. After the military, Minter took a series of low-paying jobs, from dishwasher at a drive-in, to messenger and orderly hospital work. Minter also worked in metals, constructed school furniture, did work on cars, and with crews building roads. As a result of his fabrication work, Minter got asbestos dust in his eyes in the 1960s and ‘70s. Minter had one eye operated on to mediate the asbestos; however, he wouldn't let the doctors operate the other eye. Minter never lost the feeling of grit in his eyes and was forced to retire. Upon retiring, Minter rediscovered an artistic practice dormant since childhood.

Artistic practice

African Village in America
Located on the southwest edge of Birmingham, Alabama and begun in the late 1980s and built over the course of thirty years, Minter's African Village in America is part sculpture garden, part history museum, and part memorial. The African Village in America is an ever-evolving art environment, populated by sculptures made from scrap and found materials from footwear, lawn decorations, toys, old sporting equipment, to baking utensils, and more. Although Minter's sculpture have a variety of themes and influences, from one commemorating the Sandy Hook Elementary School shooting to one dedicated to the victims of Hurricane Katrina, Minter's overriding message is to provide a recognition for the eleven million Africans shipped in bondage to America, and to their descendants who helped to build and defend America. The sculptures in the African Village in America tell the stories of African-Americans over the centuries, from the griots and warriors of West Africa to the deadly 1963 bombing at the 16th Street Baptist Church.

Exhibitions
2022 – Called to Create: Black Artists of the American South – National Gallery of Art – curated by Harry Cooper 
2019 – Whitney Biennial – Whitney Museum of American Art – curated by Rujeko Hockley and Jane Panetta
2018 – History Refused to Die: Highlights from the Souls Grown Deep Foundation Gift - Metropolitan Museum of Art
2018 - Revelations: Art from the African American South - de Young Museum, San Francisco, CA
2018 - Joe Minter: Once That River Starts to Flow - Atlanta Contemporary, Atlanta, Georgia
2017 - The Road Less Traveled Exhibition Series. American Sites: Art Environment Photography - The John Michael Kholer Arts Center, Sheboygan, WI
2015 - History Refused to Die - Alabama Contemporary Art Center, Mobile, AL
2014 - When Stars Begin to Fall: Imagination and the American South - Studio Museum in Harlem, New York
2007 - Alabama Folk Art - Birmingham Museum of Art, Birmingham, Alabama
2004 - Coming Home: Self-Taught Artists, the Bible, and the American South - Art Museum of the University of Memphis, Memphis, TN

Permanent collections 
 National Gallery of Art, Washington, D.C.
 Metropolitan Museum of Art, New York, NY
 Smithsonian American Art Museum, Washington, D.C.
 Fine Arts Museums of San Francisco, San Francisco, CA
High Museum of Art, Atlanta, GA
Birmingham Museum of Art, Birmingham, AL
Minneapolis Institute of Art

Selected publications 
 Finley, Cheryl; Griffey, Randall R.;  Peck, Amelia; Pinckney, Darry. My Soul Has Grown Deep: Black Art from the American South. Metropolitan Museum of Art, 2018
 Anglin Burgard, Timothy  (Editor), Thornton Dial (Contributor), Lonnie Holley (Contributor), Joe Minter (Contributor), Lauren Palmor (Contributor). Revelations: Art from the African American South, Prestel, 2017
 Horace Randall Williams (Author), Karen Wilkin (Author), Sharon Holland (Author), William S. Arnett (Introduction), Bernard Herman (Contributor). History Refused to Die: The Enduring Legacy of African American Art in Alabama, Tinwood Books, 2015
 Crown, Carol, ed. Coming Home: Self-Taught Artists, the Bible, and the American South, Jackson, MS: University Press of Mississippi, 2004
 Conwill, Kinshasha; Danto, Arthur C.;Testimony: Vernacular Art of the African-American South. Harry N. Abrams, 2002
 Arnett, William and Paul Arnett, eds. Souls Grown Deep: African American Vernacular Art of the South, vol. II, Atlanta: Tinwood Books, 2001

References

External links 
soulsgrowndeep.org – artist profile
Outsider Art Comes to the Metropolitan Museum – Hyperallergic

1943 births
Living people
African-American artists
Artists from Alabama
American contemporary artists
Outsider artists
Recycled art artists
21st-century African-American people
20th-century African-American people